Ragnhild Keyser (12 December 1889 – 12 October 1943) was a Norwegian painter. She was a visual artist and abstract painter  principally active during the 1920s.

Biography
Keyser was born in Oslo, Norway. She was the daughter of   Ove Ludvig Keyser (1830-1889) and   Karen Helga Ingebretsen (1849-1942).
She first studied under Harriet Backer (1909–10) and with Pola Gauguin (1916–19).

She moved to Paris in 1920 and  performed her most important works there during the years 1925–1927. She was a student of Roger Bissière and André Lhote  at Académie Ranson  in the early 1920s,  Pedro Araujo  at Académie Araujo   (1922–23) and Fernand Léger at Académie Moderne (1924–26). She became inspired by Cubism and was most influenced by André Lhote and Fernand Léger.

Keyser participated in several exhibitions in the 1920s, including Salon des Indépendants (1923 and 1926),  L'Art d'Aujourd'hui (1925) and Académie Moderne's exhibitions in Paris in 1926 and 1927. She also exhibited at the International Exhibition of Modern Art at the Brooklyn Museum in New York City (1926–27). She exhibited at Blomqvist's Kunsthandel in Oslo during 1932 and studied with  Georg Jacobsen (1935–36).

Her painting Armour is in the collection of the National Museum of Art, Architecture and Design in Oslo.

References

External links

 3 works by Keyser in Yale University Art Gallery
 Ragnhild Keyser on artnet

1889 births
1943 deaths
Artists from Oslo
Norwegian women painters
20th-century Norwegian painters
Norwegian expatriates in France
20th-century Norwegian women artists
Abstract artists